The Florida Fifth District Court of Appeal is headquartered in Daytona Beach, Florida.

History
The Fifth District Court of Appeal was created by the 1979 session of the Florida Legislature.

The Fifth District handles cases from the following counties and circuit courts: Orange and Osceola (Ninth Circuit); Volusia, Flagler, Putnam and St. Johns (Seventh Circuit); Lake, Marion, Sumter, Citrus and Hernando (Fifth Circuit); and Brevard and Seminole (18th Circuit).

Chief Judges
Judges who have served as Chief Judge of the Fifth DCA include:

Thomas D. Sawaya (2003–2005)
Robert J. Pleus Jr. (2005–2007)
David A. Monaco (2009–2011)
Richard B. Orfinger (2011–2013)
Jay P. Cohen (2017–2018)
Kerry I. Evander, Current Chief Judge

Active Judges
Judges who are currently serving on the Fifth DCA include:

Senior Judges
Senior judges are appointed to temporary judicial duty. Judges who are on senior status at the Fifth DCA include:

Richard B. Orfinger
Emerson R. Thompson Jr.
Bruce W. Jacobus
Thomas D. Sawaya

See also
 Florida District Courts of Appeal (for history and general overview)
 Florida First District Court of Appeal 
 Florida Second District Court of Appeal
 Florida Third District Court of Appeal 
 Florida Fourth District Court of Appeal

External links

Website of the Florida District Courts of Appeal
Florida Fifth District Court of Appeal Website

References

Florida appellate courts
1979 establishments in Florida
Courts and tribunals established in 1979